Verkhniye Likhobory (lit. Upper Likhobory) is a station on the Lyublinsko-Dmitrovskaya line of the Moscow Metro between Okruzhnaya and Seligerskaya stations.

The extension of the Lyublinsko-Dmitrovskaya line between Petrovsko-Razumovskaya and Seligerskaya, including Verkhniye Likhobory opened on 22 March 2018. The station is in the Beskudnikovsky and Zapadnoye Degunino Districts of Moscow, at the T-crossing of Beskudnikovsky Boulevard and Dmitrovskoye Highway. A rail yard will be constructed next to the station.

References

Moscow Metro stations
Lyublinsko-Dmitrovskaya Line
Railway stations in Russia opened in 2018
Railway stations located underground in Russia